Princess Iron Fan is a character from the 16th century Chinese novel Journey to the West. She is the wife of the Bull Demon King and mother of Red Boy. She is one of the most popular Journey to the West villains, alongside her husband the Bull Demon King, her son the Red Boy, and Baigujing.

In Journey to the West, Princess Iron Fan is not so much a goddess as in a "proper" celestial one, but rather she made the villagers living near Flaming Mountains yield to her and offer her tribute like a goddess.  She is also described as a Rakshasa/Rakshasi.

Journey to the West
Princess Iron Fan is a beautiful demoness, married to the Bull Demon King and mother to the Red Boy. She was living in Bajia Cave awaiting her husband's return, but was also angry at him for his affair with a fox-spirit woman, Princess Jade Face. The Bull Demon King described his wife as an "immortal female with excellence in spiritual practice (female Xian)".

She possessed the magical Banana Leaf Fan. The fan, made from banana leaves, is extremely large and has magical properties, as it can create giant whirlwinds which are capable of extinguishing the fire on the Flaming Mountains (the volcano was created by Wukong when he burst out of Laozi's Eight Trigrams Brazier). Princess Iron Fan used this ability to extort favors from the residents near the mountains: by fanning only once each time, the fire would only be extinguished for a year before starting again.

When Sun Wukong and his fellow pilgrims came to the region, they encountered an extremely hostile range of volcanic mountains that they could only pass if the volcanoes became inactive. Sun Wukong wanted to borrow her fan to subdue the Flaming Mountains, but she turned him down as the monkey had been on bad terms with her husband before. Sun Wukong, however, craftily transformed into a fly and flew into her mouth, down her throat, and into her soft belly.

Once inside, Sun Wukong kicked and punched Princess Iron Fan's guts until she was in so much pain that she gave him a fan. However, the fan turned out to be a fake fan which intensified the flames instead of putting them out. Having barely escaped from the fire, Sun Wukong returned, pretending to be her husband through shape shifting and obtained the real fan. Soon afterwards, the real husband came home; angry at what had happened, he pretended to be Zhu Bajie also through shape shifting and offered to carry the big fan. Lost in the moment of victory, Sun Wukong carelessly believed the Bull King and handed over the fan. Later, the Jade Emperor sent his heavenly troops to help Sun Wukong defeat Bull Demon King and Princess Iron Fan for good, and she was forced to give them the real fan. After using the fan to extinguish the fire on the Flaming Mountain, Sun Wukong forgave the princess and returned the fan to her. The princess continued her spiritual practice, and eventually achieved success.

Other legends
Her origins are unclear, but some legends depicted her as a Taoist goddess and the ancestor of the wind gods who was entrusted by the heavenly court, and all the wind gods were under her jurisdiction. She is also the mentor of Meng Po, the goddess of forgetfulness.

In Yuan zaju tradition, she is the sister of Lishan Laomu (Old Mother of the Li Mountain) and was originally a friend of the Queen Mother of the West, Pilanpo and belonged to Taoism. She once had a dispute with the Queen Mother of the West because the Queen Mother of the West brought her own wine. As a result, she rose up against the scene and turned against the heaven.

Adaptations
 The subject of the first Chinese animated feature film is a liberally adapted version of the encounter between Sun Wukong and Princess Iron Fan entitled Princess Iron Fan (1941).
 An adaptation of this occurs in the 24th episode of the Japanese television adaptation Saiyuuki, "The Fires of Jealousy."
 In the adaptation in the  1996 Journey to the West series, the Princess and Bull King have already known Monkey since childhood (they went to the same school that taught Monkey his fighting abilities) and were willing to give him the fan. But their obnoxious son, Red Boy, refuses to let his mother give the fan, thus forcing Monkey to enter her belly to force her to give him the fan.
 The Dragon Ball series Son Goku's wife Chi Chi is based on the character. When she first appeared, her mission alongside Goku was to find the Bansho fan to put out the fire in her father's castle.
 In Act-Age, competing actresses Kei Yonagi and Chiyoko Momoshiro are both cast to interpret Princess Iron Fan in an original play centered around the character.
In the film Doraemon: The Record of Nobita's Parallel Visit to the West, she appeared under the name Queen Iron Fan, as the secondary antagonist.

She also appears in the 2020 Lego Monkey Kid show as a secondary antagonist

See also
 List of media adaptations of Journey to the West

References

Sources

Journey to the West characters
Fictional demons and devils